Dabana may refer to:
 Dabanas, an ancient fortress
 Limnonectes dabanus, a species of frog